Miles Winfield Welch-Hayes (born 25 October 1996) is an English professional footballer who plays as a defender for Altrincham on loan from Harrogate Town.

Career
Welch-Hayes signed a professional contract with Oxford United in May 2016, at the age of 19. He made his League One debut for the club on 17 August 2016, playing the full 90 minutes of a 2–0 away defeat to Fleetwood Town at Highbury Stadium. He was released without making further appearances in May 2017 and joined Bath City on a permanent contract a week or so later. In October 2017 he began a one-month loan at Oxford City and started in the team that beat Colchester United of League Two in a first-round FA Cup upset on 4 November 2017. He was named in the Conference South team of the year in the 2017−18 season just after missing out on the play-offs with Bath City.

In June 2018, he signed for Macclesfield Town, newly promoted to League Two. He scored his first goal for the club at Walsall on 14 December 2019. On 1 February 2020 it was announced that he was one of three players to have left financially troubled Macclesfield during the January 2020 transfer window, following a meeting with the English Football League.

On 21 February 2020, Welch-Hayes joined Colchester United on a contract until summer 2022. He made his debut in Colchester's 3–2 aggregate League Two play-off semi-final defeat to Exeter City on 22 June 2020. He scored his first goal for the club on 3 October 2020 during their 3–3 draw with Oldham Athletic. Welch-Hayes was released at the end of the 2021–22 season.

In June 2022 he signed for Harrogate Town, also of League Two. In January 2023, he joined National League club Altrincham on loan until the end of the season.

Statistics

References

External links

Living people
1996 births
English footballers
Association football defenders
Oxford United F.C. players
Daventry Town F.C. players
North Leigh F.C. players
Banbury United F.C. players
Bath City F.C. players
Oxford City F.C. players
Macclesfield Town F.C. players
Colchester United F.C. players
Harrogate Town A.F.C. players
Altrincham F.C. players
Southern Football League players
National League (English football) players
English Football League players